Latvia competed at the 2012 Summer Olympics in London, United Kingdom from July 27 to August 12, 2012. This was the nation's tenth appearance at the Summer Olympics.

The Latvian Olympic Committee sent a total of 46 athletes to the Games, 32 men and 14 women, to compete in 12 sports. Sixteen athletes had competed in Beijing, including silver medalist Ainārs Kovals in men's javelin throw, and defending Olympic champion Māris Štrombergs in men's BMX cycling. Pistol shooter and Olympic gold medalist Afanasijs Kuzmins, the oldest of the team, at age 65, became the first Latvian athlete to compete in nine Olympic games (including three of his appearances under the Soviet Union), tying the record set by Austria's Hubert Raudaschl. Meanwhile, Jeļena Rubļevska, who won silver in Athens, became the first female modern pentathlete to compete at four Olympics, since the sport's introduction to women in 2000. Among the twelve sports played by the athletes, Latvia marked its Olympic debut in table tennis.

Latvia left London with only one gold and one bronze medal. Māris Štrombergs, who managed to successfully defend his Olympic title in the men's BMX cycling, became the first Latvian athlete to win two Olympic gold medals in the post-Soviet era. Meanwhile, Mārtiņš Pļaviņš, who became Latvia's flag bearer at the opening ceremony, and his partner Jānis Šmēdiņš won the nation's first ever Olympic medal in men's beach volleyball.

Medalists

Athletics

Latvian athletes have so far achieved qualifying standards in the following athletics events (up to a maximum of 3 athletes in each event at the 'A' Standard, and 1 at the 'B' Standard):

Key
 Note – Ranks given for track events are within the athlete's heat only
 Q = Qualified for the next round
 q = Qualified for the next round as a fastest loser or, in field events, by position without achieving the qualifying target
 NR = National record
 N/A = Round not applicable for the event
 Bye = Athlete not required to compete in round

Men
Track & road events

Field events

Combined events – Decathlon

Women
Track & road events

Field events

Combined events – Heptathlon

Canoeing

Sprint

Qualification Legend: FA = Qualify to final (medal); FB = Qualify to final B (non-medal)

Cycling

Road

BMX

Gymnastics

Artistic
Men

Judo

Modern pentathlon

Shooting

Men

Swimming

Latvian swimmers have so far achieved qualifying standards in the following events (up to a maximum of 2 swimmers in each event at the Olympic Qualifying Time (OQT), and potentially 1 at the Olympic Selection Time (OST)):

Men

Women

Table tennis

Latvia has qualified the following players.

Volleyball

Beach

Weightlifting

Latvia has qualified the following athletes.

Wrestling

Latvia has qualified the following quota places.

Key
  - Victory by Fall.
  - Decision by Points - the loser with technical points.
  - Decision by Points - the loser without technical points.

Men's freestyle

Women's freestyle

References

External links
 National Olympic committee of Latvia

Nations at the 2012 Summer Olympics
2012
2012 in Latvian sport